Albino Morales Pérez (30 May 1940 – 11 March 2020) was a Mexican professional footballer.

Born in Mexico City, Morales played club football with Toluca, América and Guadalajara. He competed at the 1968 Summer Olympics in Mexico City, where the Mexico national football team placed fourth. He also competed at the 1964 Summer Olympics in Tokyo.

On 11 March 2020, he died in Toluca.

References

External links

1940 births
2020 deaths
Footballers from Mexico City
Deportivo Toluca F.C. players
Club América footballers
C.D. Guadalajara footballers
Mexico international footballers
Olympic footballers of Mexico
Footballers at the 1964 Summer Olympics
Footballers at the 1968 Summer Olympics
Mexican footballers
Association football forwards